Drag Race Sverige (sometimes called Drag Race Sweden) is a Swedish reality competition television series based on the American series RuPaul's Drag Race. It is broadcast by SVT1 and SVT Play in Sweden and airs on WOW Presents Plus elsewhere.

The adaptation was announced in April 2022 and casting began in May. Mastiff AB produces the show. Executive producers are RuPaul and Tom Campbell, as well as World of Wonder founders Fenton Bailey and Randy Barbato. The show is presented by Robert Fux with singer and actress Kayo and radio and television host  making up the judging panel. The first season premiered March 4, 2023.

Contestants 

Ages, names, and cities stated are at time of filming.

Contestants progress

Lip syncs 
Legend:

Guest judges 
Listed in chronological order:
Daniela Rathana, singer-songwriter
Siw Malmkvist, singer
Tone Sekelius, singer
Christer Lindarw, Swedish drag queen
Fredrik Robertsson, fashion designer

Episodes

Drag Race Sverige: Untucked! 
On 19 October 2022, it was confirmed that the main season will have its own companion series called Drag Race Sverige: Untucked. This the third iteration of the Untucked series, after Drag Race Philippines: Untucked.

References

External links 
 
 

2023 in LGBT history
 
Sveriges Television original programming
Swedish LGBT-related television series
Swedish television series based on American television series
Upcoming television series
WOW Presents Plus original programming